Virginia's 41st House of Delegates district elects one of 100 seats in the Virginia House of Delegates, the lower house of the state's bicameral legislature. District 41 represents part of Fairfax County, Virginia. The seat is currently held by Democrat Eileen Filler-Corn. Filler-Corn was the Speaker of the House from 2020-2022.

Geography
District 41 represents part of Fairfax County and is located in Virginia's 11th Congressional District.

Elections
Democrat Eileen Filler-Corn first took office on March 3, 2010, after winning a special election the day before: she defeated Republican Kerry Bolognese by 37 votes. She was reelected again in 2011, 2013, 2015, and 2017.

In 2019, Filler-Corn became the Minority Leader (Leader of the Democratic Caucus) of the House of Delegate.

In the November 2019 general election, Filler-Corn ran against Libertarian Rachel Mace and Independent John Wolfe. She won with 71.6% of the vote.

References

Virginia House of Delegates districts
Government in Fairfax County, Virginia